Sakiroo, born Choi Sang-hyun, is a South Korean illustrator and character designer. The subjects for his work are varied and include caricatures of sports figures. He has been involved in exhibits and projects (see below), including those in South Korea, France, England, United Arab Emirates, China, Singapore, United States, Mexico, Colombia, and Venezuela. He lives and works in Bucheon, just outside Seoul.

Life
Sakiroo received no formal education as an artist. He said that due to not having a lot of childhood toys, he drew faces of his favorite characters on paper and fashioned them into an origami type of story to play with. He began earning money for his drawings when he was twenty. His first jobs were "special dot mini character" designs for the internet communities for Neowiz "SayClub" and "Avatar" in 2000, and for SK Communications and Cyworld "Mini-rooms" during 2003-2007. In 2005, he posed as an "artist" model for clothing brand MLB Korea, and along with his artwork, in an ad for KT&G.
   
For a book cover project in Singapore, artists were asked to choose a book that had been influential to them. He chose Stephen R. Covey's "Principle-Centered Leadership," which he said played an important part in determining his life’s path. "Despite having no formal training in art, he left a nine-year career in the corporate sector to realise his dream of becoming an artist."
   
"Sakiroo" is a nickname that he made up from syllables and sounds that he likes "Sa" "ki" "roo," wanting to distinguish his choice to become an independent artist.

Style and works
His work has been described as "a multitude of illustrations and cartoons full of color and extravagance," "inspired by cartoons and manga," influenced by "Asian themes," and combining "hand-drawn illustrations with digital coloring — using his own color theory." In an interview with KOCCA he said he mainly works on paper, which allows him to sketch in coffee shops in Seoul, without computer graphics. Manga that have influenced him include Yusuke Murata's Eyeshield 21, and Akira Toriyama's Dr. Slump and Dragon Ball. Dragon Balls second anime adaptation, Dragon Ball Z, was also an influence.

His work, though varied, sticks closely to popular culture themes, often making fun of them. In 2011, his "Yellow Lemon" characters, with "oblong heads, menacing grins, beady eyes and dental work from the '90's" populated a "school" with uniformed elite characters, including Batman, Superman, Ronald McDonald, Homer Simpson and Michael Jackson. After he used the characters again to "pick on" famous fashion brands, Hugo Boss, Ermenegildo Zegna, Burberry, Lacoste and The North Face; Trendhunter.com said "Yellow Lemon" was becoming a cultural staple itself.

In 2013, both Mass Appeal and Flavorwire, that document urban and cultural trends, noted his caricature work with Colombian artist Pol (Jean Paul Egred), "some of music’s best collabs", among those, MJ and Eddie Van Halen, Run–D.M.C. and Aerosmith, enhanced with beaks, braces and severed limbs. He had previously joined Pol in 2012, with other South Korean and Colombian artists, when they met in Miami to show an interpretation of each other's pop icons.

In 2013, he illustrated The Big Bang Theory for Warner Bros. Television; and the Striding Man for Johnnie Walker, and in 2014, Valderrama for Major League Soccer Insider.

In 2016, he spoke about his soccer illustrations on SBS TV's Football Magazine Goal! and continued educational talks with other young artists. His June 2016 autobiography, Sakiroo Breaking, details his path to becoming an artist. Kim Byung-joon of E-Daily News said, "The depth of the message is deep because it crosses over material such as philosophy, history, culture, art, and education."

Selected projects and recognition
2006: Interview and live drawing illustration for a singer’s album, Mnet TV, Seoul, South Korea
2011: NOW magazine cover, Maracaibo, Venezuela
2011: "8 Players Illustrations" for ESPN The Magazine, United States
2012:  Wall painting, Korean and Colombian artist's group, Wynwood, Florida
2012:  Sakiroo X Jean Paul Egred, Duo Musician Illustration, "Rock It", Wynwood, Florida and Bogota, Colombia
2012: Dot objects design for Jellyfish Entertainment VIXX 2nd M/V & Album, Seoul, South Korea
2013: Design competition judge, "Cut & Paste: Characterized Seoul 2013", Seoul, South Korea
2013: Speaker, Design class, The College of Architecture, Art, and Design at Mississippi State University. Mississippi State University, Starkville, Mississippi
2013: Speaker 2013 Illustrators Deathmatch, Querétaro Mexico 
2013: Concept illustration for VIP lounge large mural, Diageo's Seoul Johnnie Walker House, England
2014: "Carlos "El Pibe" Valderrama" Futbol Artist Network, featured Major League Soccer "MLS Insider series", United States
2014: "Referee", Grand Prix winner (Al Sabeh Cement), "I Fell From a Unicorn", Bronze winner (Band-aid), for Impact BBDO Dubai, Dubai Lynx International Advertising Festival, Dubai, United Arab Emirates
2014: Speaker, Create Now 2014 - 대한민국, Adobe Creative Cloud, Seoul, South Korea
2015: Banner illustration, tutorial, Adobe Dreamweaver CC, United States
2015: Playing Art Edition Two, "Seven of Diamonds", Digital Abstracts Magazine, Spain
2015: Speaker, TedxYouth, Korean Minjok Leadership Academy, Hoengseong-gun, South Korea
2016: Speaker, AAD International Design Exchange Seminar and Vision Get Wild 2015, Kaohsiung Exhibition Center, Kaohsiung, Taiwan

Solo exhibitions
2015: "Sakiroo's Illustration Fantasy", Sejong Center's Dream Forest Art Center Dream Gallery, Gangbuk-gu, South Korea

Selected group exhibitions
2012: "Korea Sports Art 2012", Mokspace Gallery, London, England
2012: "Red Bull F1 Sports Art 2012", Seoul, South Korea
2012: "According To Them, East! Meet West", Spaces Gallery, Wynwood, Florida and Bogota, Colombia
 2013: "I Love You Man", Bottleneck Art Gallery, Brooklyn, New York
 2013: "Read Carefully", Kult Gallery, Singapore
 2013: "Human Movement", Surim Cultural Foundation, Galerie 89, Paris, France
 2013: "The Big Bang Theory Artist Series", Warner Bros. Television booth at San Diego Comic-Con International, San Diego California,
 2013: "The Physics of Friendship: A Tribute to The Big Bang Theory", Gallery Nucleus and Warner Bros. Television, Alhambra California
2013: "Ichabod", Lacuna Artist Lofts, Chicago, Illinois
2013: "From Seoul to Mississippi", Visual Arts Center Gallery, Department of Art at Mississippi State University, Starkville, Mississippi
2014: "Books That Moved Me", National Library Board Read Fest 2014, Kult Gallery, Singapore

Publications

His Own
Sang-hyun Choi, editor So-young Park, Pixel Art Design (with Photoshop) (2003), 
Sang-hyun Choi, Sakiroo's Character & Dots (2005), 
Sang-hyun Choi, Sakiroo Breaking (2016),

Included In
 Yang Liu, Fantastic Illustration (2011), 
 Dopress Books, Always Me!: Self-Portraits of Global Illustrators (Inspire Series) (2013), 
 Kenny Scharf (Introduction), Andrew Kaufman (Photographer), AK Foto (Photographer), I'm in Miami Bitch! (2013), 
 Sendpoints Publishing, Beyond Illustration: Designs & Applications  (2014), 
 Hightone, Magic Paintbrush by Illustration (2015), 
 Chen Yu Mingh, AAD outstanding illustration artists in Asia (2016),

References

External links

1980 births
Living people
South Korean illustrators
Artists from Seoul
South Korean caricaturists
South Korean cartoonists
South Korean contemporary artists
People from Bucheon